is a Japanese television drama that aired from 1979 to 2011. The official English title is Mr. Kinpachi in Class 3B. Kinpachi-sensei tells the story of a third-year junior high school class in Japan; its teacher is Kinpachi Sakamoto, played by Tetsuya Takeda. The series has a lot of social commentary on issues such as homosexuality, gender dysphoria, and psychological pregnancy, as well as bullying (of both students and teachers), teenage pregnancy, teenage suicide, hikikomori, and the extreme pressure to do well in school.

The series began in 1979, a pivotal year when issues such as delinquency and on campus violence reached a fever-pitch amongst the educational spectrum; "Kinpachi-sensei," portrayed by former singer Tetsuya Takeda of Kaientai fame, attempts to resolve such problems using a blend of charisma, honesty, humor and wit.

Seasons
Over the span of 32 years, it has spawned 8 seasons. In 2001, the series helped to rocket Aya Ueto to greater national attention. In 2011, Keito Okamoto of Hey! Say! JUMP appeared in the drama's final episode as a student delinquent.

Part of Kinpachi-sensei's enduring appeal is the fact that the character's energy and idealism help to steer him through all of life's difficulties; there never seems to be a single time in the show's history in which Kinpachi is not beset by a host of social or personal problems: teen bullying, Kinpachi's son developing cancer, violence directed against teachers. Another reason for Kinpachi's long running popularity is the frank and open way he discusses these societal problems, never "sugar-coating" anything or intentionally hiding difficult issues.

Season overview

Season 1 (1979-80)
Cast
Kaoru Sugita as Yukino Asai
Shingo Tsurumi
Junko Mihara
Toshihiko Tahara
Satomi Kobayashi
Masahiko Kondō

Season 2 (1980-81)
Cast
Kiichi Naoe as Masaru Kato
Hiroyuki Okita
Maiko Kawakami
Yūsuke Kawazu as Teacher Kamibayashi

Season 3 (1988)
Cast
Akiko Ura as Yuko Yamada
Miyabi Kishi as Kimie Mizuno
Masato Hagiwara 
Katsuyuki Mori
Tadanobu Asano

Season 4 (1995-96)
Cast
Rena Komine as Mika Hiroshima
Mitsunari Hashimoto

Season 5 (1999-2000)
Cast
Shunsuke Kazama as Kenjiro Kanesue
Ayumi Oka as Chiharu Yasui
Kazuya Kamenashi

Season 6 (2001-02)
Cast
Aya Ueto as Nao Tsurumoto
Yoshikazu Tōshin
Yuika Motokariya 
Airi Taira

Season 7 (2004-05)
Cast
Hikaru Yaotome as Shu Maruyama
Sayuri Iwata 
Gaku Hamada
Tomoka Kurokawa
Miku Ishida

Season 8 (2007-08)
Cast
Mayū Kusakari
Taku Kamei

The Final (2011)
Cast
Keito Okamoto

In popular culture
 The cry of "Year three, Class B? Kinpachi-sensei!", or something similar, depending on the series it happens in, is a popular shout-out in shows on Japanese television.
 As an example, in the TV anime Lucky Star, each episode is introduced by the four main protagonists warning that they are going to start the episode. After mid-series, they are promoted to the third year in their high school. The initial introduction is changed to reflect this. Since japanese students are assigned each year to a class by teachers, and they could suddenly go to a different class being separated from previous classmates (thing which happens in Lucky Star), the main protagonists are surprised by their new class and yell at their referring teacher: "Oh, san nen B-gumi? Kuroi-sensei!"
 In the TV anime Gintama there is a segment which sometimes appears after the ending theme where Sakata Gintoki, the series' main protagonist, portrays a lollipop-smoking teacher called "Ginpachi-sensei," teaching class 3-Z.
 There's a similar segment in the TV anime Yo-kai Watch where the series' mascot, Jibanyan, is portrayed as "Nyanpachi-sensei", teaching class 3-Y.
 Author Koushun Takami's Battle Royale contains a character named Kinpatsu Sakamochi, a satirical reference to Kinpachi. In Takami's text, Sakamochi is a sadistic individual who seems to gleefully delight in the exploits of the 42 students forced to kill each other in "The Program." Some critics see Sakamochi's sadism as a sardonic attack on the idealized Kinpachi. The manga version of Battle Royale has an evil teacher named Yonemi Kamon, while the film has Kitano.
 In the Live-action version of the manga Great Teacher Onizuka (GTO), Onizuka makes a few mentions of Kinpachi-sensei, implying that he is a fan of the series, since his complete collection gets stolen in one of the beginning episodes.
 During the 2013 annual end of year Batsu game special of the popular Japanese humor show Downtown no Gaki no Tsukai ya Arahende!! "No laughing, Enthusiastic teachers", the whole cast was dressed as Kinpachi-sensei, wearing matching clothes and long wigs, apart from Hamada Masatoshi who got a short wig instead.
 And in the 2015 end of year Downtown no Gaki no Tsukai ya Arahende!! Batsu game special "No Laughing Prison escape", a parody of "Kinpachi-sensei" as "Furiwake-Sensei" was done with former Sumo wrestler Takamisakari in the lead role, chosen because of his name. Sakamoto also sang the theme song, badly, probably never having rehearsed it beforehand. Also appearing in that parody was Naoe Kiichi who reprised his role as Kato Masaru.
 In Chapter 23.5 of Shūmatsu no Valkyrie, a character named Sakamoto Inpachi appears as a contestant in a game of Mahjong teaming with the first man, Adam, against the gods Zeus and Ares in a match meant to determine the fate of humanity.
 In season 1, episode 15 of the 2019 anime adaptation of Fruits Basket, the recurring character Ayame references Kinpachi Sensei by saying "As Kinpachi-sensei once said, people are made to support one another."

References

External links
Official website (Japanese)

1979 Japanese television series debuts
2011 Japanese television series endings
Japanese drama television series
TBS Television (Japan) dramas
Kin'yō Dorama
Japanese high school television series